{{DISPLAYTITLE:C18H34O2}}
The molecular formula C18H34O2 (molar mass: 282.46 g/mol, exact mass: 282.2559 u) may refer to:

 Elaidic acid
 Oleic acid
 Petroselinic acid
 Vaccenic acid